Daniel Tarlumun Ayu, better known as Ayüü, is a Nigerian recording artiste and songwriter with sounds from R&B, Pop, Funk, Hip-Hop, and Afrobeats.

Early life 
Ayüü was born in Jos, Nigeria but moved around a lot as a child with his mother. He spent his secondary school years in Abuja and Osun before moving to England where he studied Business Administration at the University of Kent.

Career 
Ayüü started his career in music in 2016, but prior to that he tells We Are Black and Gifted, "my first musical experience was singing in the choir, singing to my aunt, singing my sister’s songs..." He is one half of SAFI, whose other member is Lady Donli.

Ayüü made his debut in 2017 with his EP 'H. E. R. (His Emotions Recorded),' a soulful introduction to his R&B-influenced foundation. He collaborated with neo-soul artist AYLØ for ‘ØÜ’, a collaborative EP released that same year. 

In the summer of 2018, Ayüü released pop project ‘Mango Juice & Bad Decisions’. At the end of the following year, 2019, he released his official debut album, ‘AYÜÜNIVERSE’, which was inspired from 2000s Nigerian pop, dancehall, R&B, rap, and more. AYÜÜNIVERSE features guest appearances from Tay Iwar, Wavy The Creator, EESKAY, GJtheCaesar, PsychoYP, Kuddi Is Dead, Lady Donli, and more.

Following the release of the Nigerian film Glamour Girls on June 24, 2022, tracks curated by Tatenda Terence Kamera "Pull Up," "4AMIN," and "Not Drake, Like Davido" by Ayüü were featured in the film's soundtrack.

In september 2022, Ayüü released his sophomore album 'Toxic Sweet'. Toxic Sweet has nine tracks and features from GJtheCaesar, Dopeman Twizzy, and Andrę Wolff, with instrumental arrangements by DOZ, Le Mav, KC, and Don Ozi.

Discography

Albums

EPs

Singles

References 

Living people
Year of birth missing (living people)
Nigerian musicians
People from Abuja
Nigerian alté singers
21st-century Nigerian male singers
Nigerian singer-songwriters